Stenolechia robusta is a moth of the family Gelechiidae. It is found in Japan (Tsushima Island).

The length of the forewings is 4.5-5.9 mm. The forewings are ash-grey, speckled with fuscous scales, marked with dark fuscous spots, including three large spots
on the costa, each near the base, at two-fifths and three-fifths, a medium-sized spot near the base beneath the fold, a small spot at one-third beneath the fold and two medium-sized spots on the fold.

References

Moths described in 1984
Stenolechia